Longe (Old Norman: le Longe or le Long) is an English and French aristocratic household, descending from the House of Bourbon-Préaux, a cadet branch of the House of Bourbon, and may refer to:

 House of Longe, a surname of Anglo-Norman origin
 Desmond Longe, British Army Major, S.O.E Agent and High Sheriff of Norfolk
 Francis Davy Longe, first-class cricketer and anti-classical economist
 John Longe (1548–1589), archbishop and member of the Privy Council of Ireland
 John Longe (priest) (1765–1834, priest and Norfolk county magistrate
 Patricia Shontz Longe, American economist
 Richard Longe, politician and royalist 
 Robert de Longe, artist
 William of Wykeham, Bishop of Winchester and Chancellor of England
 Longe family of Spixworth Park, including a list of High Sheriffs of Norfolk and Suffolk

Other uses
 Longe line, a rope used in Longeing, a technique for training horses in equestrian vaulting
 Longe cavesson, a halter-like headgear with rings to attach the longe line

See also
 DeLonge, a surname
 Long (surname)